The Libyan Civil Aviation Authority (LYCAA, previously  "Libyan Arab Jamahiriya Civil Aviation Authority") is the civil aviation authority of Libya. Its head office is at Tripoli International Airport in Tripoli.

It also serves as the aircraft accident investigation authority of the country.

See also

 Afriqiyah Airways Flight 771

References

External links
 Libyan Civil Aviation Authority
 Libyan Civil Aviation Authority 
 Libyan Civil Aviation Authority  (Archive)

Government of Libya
Libya
Aviation organizations based in Libya
Organizations investigating aviation accidents and incidents
Civil aviation in Libya